Kronen Brauerei, also known as Private Brewery Dortmund Kronen, was one of the oldest breweries in Westphalia and has its headquarters at the Old Market in Dortmund. The company was able to look back on more than 550 years of brewing tradition and was family-owned from 1729 until 1996. Dortmunder Kronen was a sponsor of Borussia Dortmund between 1992 and 1996. The motto of the partnership was "Kronen und BVB. We are going for Dortmund together." It was acquired by Dortmunder Actien Brauerei in 1996, which is part of the Radeberger Group. Its headquarters are now home to the "Wenkers" catering business. The brand continues to be manufactured.

See also 
List of oldest companies

References 
This article uses text translated from the article Kronen Privatbrauerei Dortmund from the German Wikipedia, retrieved on 23 February 2017.

External links 
Homepage in German

1430s establishments in the Holy Roman Empire
Breweries in Germany
Beer brands of Germany
Manufacturing companies based in Dortmund
Companies established in the 15th century
Pages translated from German Wikipedia
Dr. Oetker